Brown Mountain is a summit in Iron County in the U.S. state of Missouri.

Brown Mountain has the name of the local Brown family.

References

Mountains of Iron County, Missouri
Mountains of Madison County, Missouri
Mountains of Missouri